Seares may refer to:

 Seares (Castropol), a parish in Castropol, Asturias, Spain
 Seares (crater), a lunar impact crater located in the northern part of the Moon's far side
 Frederick Hanley Seares (1873–1964), American astronomer

See also
 Sears, an American chain of department stores
 Sears (disambiguation)